Liza Sylvestre (born November 13, 1983) is an American visual artist born and raised in Minneapolis, Minnesota. She is known for detailed abstract mixed media paintings and drawings. Her current work explores new media such as installation and video art. Much of her work revolves around our sensory perceptions and misconceptions of the world around.

Personal life 
While growing up in Minneapolis she began to lose her hearing around the age of six. She had a very gradual decline in her hearing ability that became more debilitating around the age of sixteen. She had a cochlear implant surgically placed in her ear to improve her hearing in 2003 when she was 20 years old. After graduating with her Bachelor of Arts in 2006 she moved to Miami for 6 years to work and exhibit her artwork. 

She currently lives in Illinois with her son.

Exhibitions 
Solo Exhibitions

2019

 Third Space. New Genres Art Space, Rockford, IL
 Third Space. The Plains Art Museum, Fargo, ND

2018

 Captioned. Granary Arts, Ephraim, UT

2017

 Interference. Soo Visual Arts Center, Minneapolis, MN

2015

 Meridians. Public Functionary, Minneapolis, MN

2014

 Elements Unheard. MacRostie Art Center, Grand Rapids, MN

Group Exhibitions

2020

 Flashlight Project for Heavy Breathing. Land & Sea Gallery, Oakland, CA
 Voices in the Gallery. John Hansard Gallery, Southampton, England

2019

 The Other Four. The Plains Art Museum, Fargo, ND
 MFA Thesis Show. Krannert Art Museum, Champaign, IL

2018

 A Place for Us. Hairpin Arts Center, Chicago IL
 Humanly Possible: The Empathy Exhibition. Frederick Layton Gallery of Milwaukee Institute of Art & Design, Milwaukee, WI

2017

 Twentieth International Opening Exhibition, Woman Made Gallery, Chicago, IL
 Between the Sky & the Earth. Roots & Culture Contemporary Art Center, Chicago, IL

2016

 Michael Dandley / Liza Sylvestre. Nahcotta, Portsmouth, NH
 Art(ists) on the Verge 7 Fellowship Exhibition. Soap Factory, Minneapolis, MN

2015

 Enormous Tiny Art Show 18. Nahcotta, Portsmouth, NH

2014

 Enormous Tiny Art Show 16. Nahcotta, Portsmouth, NH
 Ned Evans / Carly Glovinski / Liza Sylvestre. Nahcotta, Portsmouth, NH
 Get Lucky. Soo Visual Arts Center, Minneapolis, MN

2013

 Enormous Tiny Art Show 14. Nahcotta, Portsmouth, NH

2012

 Natural Curiosities. Miami International Airport, Miami, FL
 This and That. Art Center of South Florida, Miami, FL

2011

 Recently Acquired. Audrey Love Gallery, Miami, FL

2010

 Small Works. The Swenson Gallery, Miami FL
 Lucky You. Audrey Love Gallery, Miami FL

Screenings & Events

2019

 The Film and Video Poetry Symposium at Cinema Kosmos, Moscow, Russia

2018

 Captioned. Lease Agreement, Huntsville, TX
 Symposium on Sensory Loss and Art. Weisman Art Museum, Minneapolis MN
 The Film & Video Poetry Society. Los Angeles, CA
 The Feminist Film Festival. Champaign, IL

2017

 Northwest Conference of the Society for Photographic Education. Portland, OR

Commissions 
 25 piece commission for the 4 star James Hotel, Miami Beach FL

Awards 
2021

 Awarded Joan Mitchell Fellowship from the Joan Mitchell Foundation

2017
 Art Works Grant, National Endowment for the Arts (in conjunction with SooVAC)
 Travel Grant, University of Illinois at Urbana Champaign
 Mary Jane Neer Scholarship, University of Illinois at Urbana Champaign

2016
 University Fellowship, University of Illinois at Urbana Champaign

2015
 Art(ists) on the Verge 7 Fellow (Jerome Foundation)
 VSA Jerome - Emerging Artist Grantee
 Metropolitan Regional Arts Council - Arts Learning Grantee

2014
 Minnesota State Arts Board - Artist Initiative Grant
 Minnesota State Arts Board - Arts Learning Grant

See also 
 List of American artists

References

External links 
 MN Artists
 Liza Sylvestre Homepage

1983 births
Living people
Artists from Minneapolis
American women artists
University of Minnesota College of Liberal Arts alumni
21st-century American women